When All the Pieces Fit is the tenth studio release by Peter Frampton and the follow-up to his Premonition album from 1986.

Track listing

Personnel
Peter Frampton - vocals, guitar, bass guitar, bass synthesizer, synthesizer, sequencer, drum programming
Nathan East - bass on "Holding On To You", "My Heart Goes Out To You" and "People All Over The World"
John Regan - bass guitar on "Now and Again"
Chris Lord-Alge - synthesizer on "Holding on to You" and "Now and Again"
John Robinson, Steve Ferrone - drums
Lenny Castro - percussion
Rick Wills, Jean McClain, Mark Williamson, Alfie Silas, Danny Wilde, B.A. Robertson - backing vocals
Sam Riney - tenor saxophone on "This Time Around"
Technical
Leo Posillico - cover painting

References

 https://www.discogs.com/fr/Peter-Frampton-When-All-The-Pieces-Fit/release/891987

1989 albums
Peter Frampton albums
Albums produced by Chris Lord-Alge
Atlantic Records albums
Albums produced by Peter Frampton